Michael Peter Flannelly (21 February 1930 – 11 September 2021) was an Irish hurler. At club level he played with Mount Sion and was also a member of the Waterford senior hurling team. Flannelly usually lined out as a forward.

Career
Flannelly first came to hurling prominence at juvenile and underage levels with the Mount Sion club. An undefeated tenure with the club's minor team yielded three successive championship titles before being drafted onto the Mount Sion senior team. Flannelly's senior club career lasted nearly 20 years, during which time he won a record 15 County Championship titles from 18 appearances in finals. His success at underage level with the club brought him to the attention of the inter-county selectors, and he captained the Waterford minor team to the All-Ireland Minor Championship title in 1948. Flannelly joined the senior team during the 1949-50 league and remained with the team for 16 seasons. He won an All-Ireland Championship title after scoring 1-01 from wing-forward against Kilkenny in the 1959 All-Ireland final replay. Flannelly's other honours include three Munster Championships, one National Hurling League and an Oireachtas title. He also earned inclusion on the Munster team in the Railway Cup.

Personal life and death
Flannelly was born in Waterford in February 1930. His Castlebar-born father, Matt, enjoyed a distinguished sporting career with the Galway senior football team and lined out in the 1919 All-Ireland final defeat by Kildare. Flannelly qualified as a printer and worked for many years at Croke Printers in Waterford.

Flannelly died on 11 September 2021, aged 91.

Honours
Mount Sion
Waterford Senior Hurling Championship: 1948, 1949, 1951, 1953, 1954, 1955, 1956, 1957, 1958, 1959, 1960, 1961, 1963, 1964, 1965
Waterford Senior Football Championship: 1953, 1955, 1956, 1959
Waterford Minor Hurling Championship: 1946, 1947, 1948

Waterford
All-Ireland Senior Hurling Championship: 1959
Munster Senior Hurling Championship: 1957, 1959, 1963
National Hurling League: 1962-63
All-Ireland Minor Hurling Championship: 1948 (c)
Munster Minor Hurling Championship: 1948 (c)

References

1930 births
2021 deaths
Mount Sion hurlers
Waterford inter-county hurlers
Munster inter-provincial hurlers
All-Ireland Senior Hurling Championship winners